The 1895 Mississippi A&M Aggies football team represented the Mississippi Agricultural & Mechanical College—now known as Mississippi State University—as independent during the 1901 college football season. Led by W. M. Matthews in his first and only season as head coach, the Aggies compiled a record of 0–2.

Schedule

References

Mississippi A&M
Mississippi State Bulldogs football seasons
College football winless seasons
Mississippi A&M Aggies football